The Barotse barb (Enteromius barotseensis) is a species of ray-finned fish in the genus Enteromius from the southern Congo Basin, Zambezi, Okavango, Cunene and Kafue.

Footnotes

References

Barotse barb
Barotseland
Barotse barb
Barotse barb